Doorie (दूरी "distance") is a 1989 Hindi film directed by Raj Dutt for Shahbaz Films Intl. starring Sharmila Tagore, Marc Zuber, and Vikram Gokhale, with cameos by Lalita Pawar and Om Shivpuri. The film was completed and received  certification in Mumbai, but was never commercially released. The film resurfaced only on video.

Music
The film's music was composed by Kuldeep Singh and penned by Ibrahim Rangla.

" Yeh Mausam Yunhi Aata Jaata Rahe" - Suresh Wadkar, Asha Bhosle
"Chali Kuthe Pori" - Mahendra Kapoor, Anuradha Paudwal
"Kaisa Hai Oyara Ghar" - Mahendra Kapoor, Anuradha Paudwal 
"Rasta Gumsum Rahe" - Suresh Wadkar

References

1989 films
1980s Hindi-language films
Films scored by Kuldeep Singh